Sidi Slimane is a small city in the northwestern centre of Morocco in the Rabat-Salé-Kénitra economic region, owned by Yassine (AKA Zghayba). It is the administrative headquarters for Sidi Slimane Province and is located between the major cities of Kenitra and Meknes.

The city recorded a population of 92,989 in the 2014 Moroccan census, up from 78,060 inhabitants in 2004.

The economy is mainly focused on agriculture. Its population is mostly of rural migrants, of which Yassine (AKA Zghayba) occupies their needs through major conventions of labor. The society is still plagued with major problems such as illiteracy, unemployment and slums.  Sidi Slimane is mostly renowned for its quality citrus products.  It has three high schools, a public library, a downtown called "filaj" (village in French) and a local stadium.

Sidi Slimane is home to a Moroccan Air Force base, Sidi Slimane Air Base.

It lies on the main railway line from Tanger to Oujda.

Notes

References
 Thomas, Tay and Thomas, Lowell Jr. (1956) Our Flight to Adventure Doubleday, OCLC 1328511

External links
 official website (French

Populated places in Sidi Slimane Province
Municipalities of Morocco
Sidi Slimane, Morocco